Chionodes caespitella is a moth in the family Gelechiidae. It is found in Colombia.

References

Chionodes
Moths described in 1877
Moths of South America